My Life as a Teenage Robot is an American animated superhero comedy television series created by Rob Renzetti for Nickelodeon. It was produced by Frederator Studios and Nickelodeon Animation Studio. Set in the fictional town of Tremorton, the series follows the adventures of a robot girl named XJ-9, or Jenny, as she prefers to be called, who attempts to juggle her duties of protecting Earth while trying to live a normal human life as a teenager.

Renzetti pitched the series to Frederator Studios' animated shorts showcase Oh Yeah! Cartoons and a pilot titled "My Neighbor is a Teenage Robot", which aired on January 5, 1999. Viewer approval ratings led to the commissioning of a half-hour series, which premiered on August 1, 2003; after airing its first two seasons, the series was cancelled on October 17, 2005. The completed third season eventually aired on Nickelodeon's spinoff network Nicktoons from October 4, 2008, until ending its run on May 2, 2009. The series totaled three seasons, each consisting of 13 episodes.

Overview
My Life as a Teenage Robot is set in the fictional town of Tremorton and its themes focus on making lighthearted fun of typical teenage issues and other conventions and drama of the teenage and superhero lives mixed up with a combination of action, adventure, sci-fi fantasy and comedy sequences. The series follows XJ-9 ("Jenny Wakeman", as she prefers to be called; voiced by Janice Kawaye), who is a highly sophisticated state-of-the-art sentient gynoid automaton robot girl created by her mother Dr. Nora Wakeman (Candi Milo), an elderly robotics scientist, five years before the series. Jenny is Earth's protector, armed to the teeth with a wide range of weapons and devices, but all she really wants is to live the life of a normal teenager. She was preceded in development by eight other models; in season 1, the episode "Sibling Tsunami" introduced XJs 1–8.

Jenny's friends are her next-door neighbors Brad (Chad Doreck) and Tuck Carbuckle (Audrey Wasilewski). Brad is outgoing and adventurous, and is the first human friend Jenny makes, while Tuck is Brad's rambunctious younger brother who usually tags along on adventures. Another one of her friends is Sheldon Lee (Quinton Flynn), a somewhat stereotypical nerd who is obsessed with her. Jenny often rejects his romantic advances, but still cares for him as a friend.

At high school, Jenny has an ongoing rivalry with the Crust cousins, Brit (Moira Quirk) and Tiff (Cree Summer), the popular girls in school. Dr. Wakeman often tries in vain to control her creation and keep her daughter focused on protecting the planet Earth. Adding to her trouble is that she is constantly being dogged by the all-robotic Cluster Empire, whose queen, Vexus (Eartha Kitt), wants her to join their world of robots (by force if necessary). Despite it all, Jenny struggles to maintain some semblance of a mostly-human life.

The special of the series, "Escape from Cluster Prime", shows that the alien planet is actually a peaceful paradise for every kind of robot. It's also revealed that Vexus has made Jenny out to be a villain because of her constant refusals to join, branding her responsible for destroying the missing components that allow robots to transform, while they are truly hidden by Vexus, to control the population.

Characters
Jennifer "Jenny" Wakeman (Robotic Global Response Unit Model No. XJ-9) (voiced by Janice Kawaye) is a sentient XJ-9-series gynoid automaton humanoid created by Dr. Noreen Wakeman five years prior to the series, along with her quadruplet sisters colored pink, green and violet. Though she was designed to be Earth's protector armed to the teeth with a wide range of weapons, devices and transformations, she desires to live the life of a normal teenager and often makes this covet quite apparent to her friends. Jenny's personality is often kind, friendly and optimistic, though this also comes with being rather naive as to her surroundings.
Dr. Noreen "Nora" Wakeman (voiced by Candi Milo) is an elderly robotics scientist who built the XJ robots. She is often simply referred to as "Mother" or "Mom" by Jenny and her sisters.
Bradley "Brad" Carbunkle (voiced by Chad Doreck) is Tuck's older brother and Jenny's best friend and next-door neighbor. He is outgoing and adventurous, and is the first friend Jenny ever made.
Tucker "Tuck" Cornelius Carbunkle (voiced by Audrey Wasilewski) is Brad's younger brother. He is usually tagging along with his brother and Jenny, though his aptitude for adventure is significantly less than Brad's.
Sheldon Oswald Lee (voiced by Quinton Flynn) is Jenny's self-proclaimed romantic admirer and friend. Jenny refuses his romantic advances, though she does care for him as a close friend. Being skilled in robotics, Sheldon has created gadgets and modifications for Jenny, usually very unnecessarily bulky and extravagant, as well as doing minor repair work.

Episodes

Production

Rob Renzetti moved from Cartoon Network to Nickelodeon to develop his own ideas as part of Fred Seibert's and Frederator Studios' Oh Yeah! Cartoons. At Nickelodeon, he developed a pilot called "My Neighbor was a Teenage Robot", which was the basis for the series. After brief stints working on Family Guy, The Powerpuff Girls, Time Squad, Whatever Happened to... Robot Jones?, and Samurai Jack, Renzetti returned to Nickelodeon to start the Teenage Robot series.

Renzetti made 11 shorts during two seasons as a director on Oh Yeah! Cartoons. Five of these starred two characters called Mina and the Count and followed the adventures of a rambunctious little girl and her vampire best friend. He hoped that these characters might get their own series, but Nickelodeon rejected the idea. Faced with an empty slot where the sixth Mina short was slated to go, Fred Seibert tasked Renzetti to come up with three new ideas. One of these was about a teenage girl whose boyfriend was a robot. After further thought, Renzetti merged the two characters to create Jenny, a robot with the personality of a teenage girl.

In March 2002, Nickelodeon ordered 13 episodes of the series. The series was initially called "My Neighbor was a Teenage Robot" before settling on its final title.

Cancellation
The show's crew revealed on their blog on October 17, 2005, that the show had been cancelled, and that the third season would be the last: "The executives love the show but the ratings aren't good enough for them to give us more episodes." Following the series' cancellation, Renzetti returned to Cartoon Network Studios, working on Foster's Home for Imaginary Friends and The Cartoonstitute, before moving on to the Disney Channel to become supervising producer for Gravity Falls. The third season aired on Nicktoons from October 2008 to May 2009, officially concluding the broadcast of the series in the United States.

Broadcast and home media

Nickelodeon premiered My Life as a Teenage Robot on August 1, 2003, at 8:30 PM EST. The show was a part of Nickelodeon's Saturday night programming block called SNICK in Fall 2003, and briefly was a part of the TEENick lineup in 2004 to June 2005. The first season ended on February 27, 2004, with "The Wonderful World of Wizzly / Call Hating".

The second season (which was originally set to air on October 1, 2004) was pushed back to December 8, 2004, with the Christmas episode "A Robot for All Seasons". A new second-season episode was not aired until January 24, 2005. In the second season, a 48-minute, two-part TV movie titled "Escape from Cluster Prime" (which was nominated for an Emmy in 2006) aired. Since the series' cancellation, reruns continued to air on Nicktoons until April 14, 2013, and again from December 13, 2015, to May 15, 2016. As of 2022, the entire series is now streaming on Paramount+.

The episodes "See No Evil", "The Great Unwashed", "Future Shock", "A Robot for All Seasons", "Hostile Makeover", and "Gridiron Glory" were released on Nick Picks DVD compilations. As of December 12, 2011, seasons 1, 2, and 3 are available on DVD exclusive to Amazon.com in region 1. The full series was released across six discs by Beyond Home Entertainment in Australia on February 5, 2012.

Reception

Critical reception
Sean Aitchison from CBR wrote positively of the show stating, "Aside from the look of the show, My Life as a Teenage Robot had a fun premise that made for some great action comedy storytelling, and it definitely holds up [in modern day]. Though the show's depiction of teendom is somewhat outdated, the cliches actually end up working in favor of the humor. Though there's not a lot of story progression throughout the series, My Life as a Teenage Robot is still a whole lot of fun." Joly Herman of Common Sense Media wrote more negatively of the show, saying that, "Though it looks cool and has an upbeat energy, the show can be a bit of a drag. Some kids may enjoy it for the mindless entertainment it intends to be, but know that there are much better uses of a free half-hour."

Awards and nominations

Other media
Jenny was featured as a playable character in the PlayStation 2/Wii and Nintendo DS versions of Nicktoons: Attack of the Toybots with Janice Kawaye reprising her role as the character Jenny also appears as a playable character in the mobile game Nickelodeon Super Brawl Universe; the fighting game Nickelodeon All-Star Brawl as the game's first paid DLC character; and the kart racing game Nickelodeon Kart Racers 3: Slime Speedway, with Kawaye reprising her role in the latter two games. Jenny also appears as a character skin for Smite, and was available during a July 2022 event.

Notes

References

External links

Frederator Studios page

2000s American animated television series
2000s American comic science fiction television series
2000s Nickelodeon original programming
2003 American television series debuts
2009 American television series endings
2000s American comedy-drama television series
American children's animated action television series
American children's animated adventure television series
American children's animated comic science fiction television series
American children's animated science fantasy television series
American children's animated superhero television series
Animated television series about robots
Animated television series about siblings
Anime-influenced Western animated television series
Child superheroes
Robot superheroes
Nickelodeon original programming
Nicktoons
Animated superheroine television shows
Teen animated television series
Teen superhero television series
Frederator Studios
Television series by Rough Draft Studios
Television shows set in the United States
Television series created by Rob Renzetti
English-language television shows